The  is a third-sector Japanese railway company whose major shareholders include the Tochigi and Fukushima prefectural governments.

Aizu Kinugawa Line

The  is a 30.7 kilometre railway line from Shin-Fujiwara Station in Nikkō, Tochigi to Aizu-Kōgen Oze-guchi Station Minamiaizu, Fukushima, Fukushima Prefecture.

The name of the line comes from the Aizu area at the northern end and the Kinugawa Onsen hot spring resort area at the southern end.

History
The construction began as a part of the Japan Railway Construction Corporation. It was taken over by Yagan Railway.
9 October 1986: Starts operations.
12 October 1990: Direct service onto Aizu-Tajima Station on Aizu Railway Aizu Line begins.
18 March 2006: The nickname Hot Spa. Line debuts.

Stations
Limited Express Revaty Aizu (リバティ会津) is a Limited Express service operated by Tobu Railway. Reserved seats cost 380 yen on the Aizu-Kinugawa Line. However, there is in a case of passengers do not have to purchase the Express Ticket for reserving the seats if you get on and off at stations in between Kinugawaonsen Station and Aizu-Tajima Station. 
Aizu Mount Express (Aizuマウントエクスプレス)  is operated by Aizu Railway. Passengers can ride on the trains without an additional ticket.
Ozatoro Tenbo Ressha Yu-Meguri (お座トロ展望列車 湯めぐり号)  is operated by Aizu Railway. Reserved seats cost 320 yen.

References

This article incorporates material from the corresponding article in the Japanese Wikipedia

External links

Official Website(Ja)

Railway companies of Japan
Rail transport in Fukushima Prefecture
Rail transport in Tochigi Prefecture
Railway companies established in 1986
1986 establishments in Japan
Japanese third-sector railway lines